Hawk's Nest Creek Airport  is a public use airport located near Hawk's Nest Creek, The Bahamas.

See also
List of airports in the Bahamas

References

External links 
 Airport record for Hawk's Nest Creek Airport at Landings.com

Airports in the Bahamas